Rondeletia galeottii is a species of plant in the family Rubiaceae. It is endemic to Mexico.

References

Flora of Mexico
galeottii
Vulnerable plants
Taxonomy articles created by Polbot